The 1999 San Diego State Aztecs football team represented San Diego State University in the 1999 NCAA Division I-A football season. The Aztecs were led by head coach Ted Tollner and they played their home games at the Qualcomm Stadium.

Schedule

References

San Diego State
San Diego State Aztecs football seasons
San Diego State Aztecs football